Cristian Alberto Tarragona (born 9 April 1991) is an Argentine footballer who plays as a forward for Gimnasia La Plata.

References

External links

Tarragona in Independiente 

1991 births
Living people
Argentine footballers
Argentine expatriate footballers
Association football forwards
Argentine Primera División players
Primera Nacional players
Torneo Federal A players
Ascenso MX players
Tiro Federal footballers
Club Atlético Temperley footballers
Independiente Rivadavia footballers
Club Atlético Platense footballers
Club y Biblioteca Ramón Santamarina footballers
Juventud Unida Universitario players
Atlante F.C. footballers
Club Atlético Patronato footballers
Club Atlético Vélez Sarsfield footballers
Club de Gimnasia y Esgrima La Plata footballers
Argentine expatriate sportspeople in Mexico
Expatriate footballers in Mexico
Footballers from Santa Fe, Argentina